Stephen Cosgrove (born 29 December 1980 in Glasgow), is a Scottish footballer, who plays as a midfielder.

Club career
Cosgrove began his career with Manchester United. After an unsuccessful trial with Ipswich Town, he returned to Scotland in 2001 to join Motherwell, where he made a handful of appearances. He was one of 19 players controversially released by the Lanarkshire side when they entered into administration in April 2002. Stephen then joined Clyde where he featured in the team which finished runners up in the Scottish First Division. He then left Clyde to join ambitious Gretna, where he played for two years.

References

External links

Living people
1980 births
Scottish footballers
Manchester United F.C. players
Motherwell F.C. players
Stirling Albion F.C. players
Clyde F.C. players
Gretna F.C. players
Stenhousemuir F.C. players
Scottish Premier League players
Scottish Football League players
Kilwinning Rangers F.C. players
Association football midfielders